Culture Against Man is a 1963 book-length ethnography by anthropologist Jules Henry of his native United States culture. The book is presented in three parts: American life and its institutions, discussion on child-rearing, and discussion on nursing homes.

References 

 
 
 
 
 
 
 
 
 
 
 http://www.nybooks.com/articles/1964/04/02/as-a-teen-age-boy-of-the-twentieth-century/

1963 non-fiction books
American non-fiction books
Anthropology books
English-language books
Random House books
Books about education